German Scholars Boston, also known as German Scholars Agency, and abbreviated as GSA or GSB, is an independent organization of more than 12,000 German-speaking scholars, alumni and professionals living and working in Cambridge or the greater Boston area interested in Germanic culture. It comprises scientists, scholars, students, fellows, post-docs and alumni from all major universities in the area, such as Harvard University, Massachusetts Institute of Technology, Boston University and Tufts University, as well as professionals from different companies, and people from government- and non-governmental organizations. It has more than 6000 alumni.

GSB provides a forum for its members to meet, discuss, exchange ideas and vital information. GSB invites to specific cultural and social events to get together on a regular basis.

External links
 German Scholars Boston .NET website
 German Scholars Boston .COM website
 German Scholars Boston .ORG website
 German Students Boston .NET website
 German Students Boston .COM website
 German Students Boston .ORG website
 German Scholars Agency .NET website
 German Scholars Agency .COM website
 German Scholars Agency .ORG website

Organizations based in Boston
German-American culture in Massachusetts
Germany–United States relations